Keith J. Roberts (July 14, 1942) is an American academic. He currently serves as the Director (honorary) of the Institute for Global Health Innovations at Duy Tan University in Danang, Vietnam. He was a Senior Research Fellow at the Institute for International Studies in Education (IISE) at the University of Pittsburgh from 2009 to 2017.

Roberts was the Vice-President for Academics at Brigham Young University - Hawaii from 2000 to 2008.  Prior to his work at BYU-Hawaii, he served in senior administrative positions at Milwaukee Area Technical College (MATC), where his work centered on institutional research, strategic planning, and development.  An expert in university accreditation and strategic planning, Roberts has served as a member and vice chair of several accrediting committees for the Western Association of Schools and Colleges (WASC), and has served on review panels for the WASC Commission.  Roberts handled and participated in college and university accreditation in both the North Central Association (NCA) and the WASC.

Roberts received his PhD from Marquette University in Milwaukee, Wisconsin. His research and consulting activities center on the history of education with a special emphasis on the role of culture in the development of higher education policy and programs. He has served as a consultant for businesses, governments, and universities in the United States and throughout Asia and the Pacific Islands.

References

Living people
1942 births
University of Pittsburgh faculty
Brigham Young University–Hawaii faculty
Marquette University alumni